Bobby Dale Earnhardt (born September 1, 1987) is an American professional stock car racing driver. He last competed part-time in the NASCAR Xfinity Series, driving the No. 66 Toyota Camry for MBM Motorsports.

Racing career
Earnhardt raced in the ARCA Truck Series from 2013 to 2016, where he won Rookie of the Year in 2013. On May 21, 2017, he made his major stock car debut in the ARCA Racing Series, driving the No. 3 Chevrolet for Hixson Motorsports. He started 24th, and finished 21st after a crash on lap 165.

On September 8, 2017, Earnhardt made his NASCAR Xfinity Series debut in the No. 40 Chevrolet for MBM Motorsports at Richmond International Raceway. He qualified 40th for the race and finished 34th. Earnhardt had been scheduled to make his debut in the series on July 29 at Iowa Speedway, in the same team's No. 13 Chevrolet, but he failed to qualify for that race.

Family life
Bobby is a fourth-generation stock car racing driver, being the eldest son/child of Kerry Earnhardt, the eldest grandchild of NASCAR Hall of Fame driver Dale Earnhardt, and the eldest great-grandchild of Ralph Earnhardt. He is also the older brother of Jeffrey Earnhardt, and the nephew of Dale Earnhardt Jr.

Bobby and Jeffrey also have a paternal half-sister, Kayla and two maternal half-brothers, James Ray and David.

Bobby and his wife Kimberly have three children, a son and two daughters.

Motorsports career results

NASCAR
(key) (Bold – Pole position awarded by qualifying time. Italics – Pole position earned by points standings or practice time. * – Most laps led.)

Xfinity Series

 Season still in progress
 Ineligible for series points

ARCA Racing Series
(key) (Bold – Pole position awarded by qualifying time. Italics – Pole position earned by points standings or practice time. * – Most laps led.)

References

External links
 

Living people
1987 births
Racing drivers from North Carolina
Bobby Dale
ARCA Menards Series drivers
NASCAR drivers
People from Mooresville, North Carolina